Ixtlán District is located in the Sierra Norte region, in the northeastern area of the State of Oaxaca, Mexico.

The district includes 26 municipalities, bringing together a total of 161 settlements. At the 2000 census, they contained a total of 40,218 inhabitants, the majority of whom were indigenous Zapotec speakers.

Municipalities

The district includes the following municipalities:

Abejones
Capulalpam de Méndez
Evangelista Analco
Guelatao de Juárez
Ixtlán de Juárez
Natividad
Nuevo Zoquiapam
San Juan Atepec
San Juan Chicomezúchil
San Juan Quiotepec
San Miguel Aloápam
San Miguel Amatlán
San Miguel del Río
San Miguel Yotao
San Pablo Macuiltianguis
San Pedro Yaneri
San Pedro Yólox
Santa Ana Yareni
Santa Catarina Ixtepeji
Santa Catarina Lachatao
Santa María Jaltianguis
Santa María Yavesía
Santiago Comaltepec
Santiago Laxopa
Santiago Xiacuí
Teococuilco de Marcos Pérez

See also
Municipalities of Oaxaca
Ixtlán Zapotec

References

Districts of Oaxaca
Sierra Norte de Oaxaca